Edgar Wood (17 May 1860 – 1935) was a British architect, artist and draftsman who practised from Manchester at the turn of the 20th century and gained a considerable reputation in the United Kingdom. He was regarded as a proponent of the Arts and Crafts movement which was prevalent between 1860 and 1910.

Wood's work is principally domestic, but he designed several churches and small commercial buildings. He worked as an individual designer, mostly with only one assistant, and confined himself to the smaller type of building that he could control personally. Although he was active in Manchester for over twenty years, most of his work is in nearby towns, such as Rochdale, Oldham and Middleton (of which he was native), and in outlying districts such as Bramhall and Hale.

He contributed to Manchester in various ways. He was a founder of the Northern Art Workers' Guild in 1896, one of the major provincial societies within the Arts and Crafts Movement and was president of the Manchester Society of Architects from 1911 to 1912. Wood retired in 1921 and twenty one of his architectural works are listed.

Early years
Wood was born in 1860, the sixth of eight children born to Thomas Broadbent Wood and Mary Sykes. Only three of the children lived to adulthood. The family lived in Middleton and Wood's father was a mill owner, a Unitarian, a Liberal and had a reputation as a strict disciplinarian. Edgar was educated at the local Queen Elizabeth Grammar School.

The direction of Edgar's life after school was a controversial subject in the Wood household. It had been assumed by his father that Edgar would enter the family cotton business but he had different ideas. Edgar's ambition was to be an artist. The difference in opinion was finally resolved in a compromise which saw Edgar agreeing to train as an architect.

Career

Edgar Wood was articled to Mills and Murgatroyd, a Manchester architectural firm responsible for a number of prominent buildings in the Manchester area. Perhaps the best way to judge how Wood felt about his years as a pupil can be gleaned from his own comments in a lecture he delivered in 1900 in Birmingham, "My earliest architectural years were passed in an atmosphere where beautiful creative powers as applied to building, and life in design generally, were drowned in the solemnity of commerce, tracing paper and the checking of quantities."

Edgar passed the RIBA qualifying examinations and became an Associate in 1885. He set up his own office in Middleton and his first commission seems to have been for a shelter and drinking fountain (below) paid for by his stepmother and placed in the Middleton market square to commemorate Queen Victoria's Jubilee.

By 1892, it appears that his practice was flourishing and he moved into new premises at 78 Cross Street in the heart of Manchester. Ever the artist he would arrive at work wearing a large black cloak, lined with red silk, a flat, broad-brimmed hat and brandishing a silver handled cane. He said, "If an architect is not allowed to advertise his name he must advertise his personality."

John H. G. Archer says of Wood that, "Architecturally, Wood's sympathy lay with the progressive movement of the day, represented first by William Morris and the Arts and Crafts Movement". Wood was a founder member of the Northern Art Worker's Guild and became its Master in 1897. Wood practised in various crafts and he designed furniture, jewellery and metalwork. Archer adds, "In Wood's architecture the influences of both the Arts and Crafts Movement and Art Nouveau are clearly apparent, the former by his revival of the vernacular traditions of Lancashire and West Riding buildings, and the latter by his use of elongated forms and interwoven motifs."

Wood was instrumental in saving the colonnade of Manchester's first town hall, designed by Francis Goodwin, which stood in King Street and was demolished c. 1911. Wood raised a public appeal and prepared a scheme for the re-erection of the colonnade in Platt Fields park, and when this was rejected he drew up another for a site in Heaton Park where the colonnade now stands, a magnificent Ionic wide screen and a fine parkland feature."

Wood devised numerous masterplans for the Manchester Corporation. The city was burgeoning by the Edwardian era and needed houses to clear slums. One of his masterplans which was submitted in 1909 included an unorthodox radial suburban plan for Withington which centred on a small village. Wood's masterplan was rejected, but influenced future designs. Numerous housing estates in south Manchester in areas such as Withington and Burnage have houses centred on a radial plan as opposed to straight streets of terraced houses.

List of works
Temple Street Baptist Church, Middleton – built 1889 (Grade II)
Halecroft, Hale – built 1890 (Grade II*)
Silver Street Chapel – built 1893 (Grade II)
Redcroft and Fencegate, Middleton – built 1885 (Grade II)
Old Clergy House, Almondbury – built 1898 (Grade II)
31–37 Broad Street, Rochdale – built 1899 (Grade II)
Briarcourt, Lindley – built 1895 (Grade II)
Long Street Methodist Church, Middleton (now renamed The Edgar Wood Centre, Middleton) – built 1899 (Grade II*)
51–53 Rochdale Road, Middleton – built 1900 (Grade II)
Homestead, Trafford – built 1901 (Grade II)
Banney Royd, Huddersfield – built 1901 (Grade I)
Arkholme, 1 Towncroft Avenue, Middleton - built 1901 (Grade II)
Ponsonby and Carlile Office – built 1902 (Grade II)
Lindley Clock Tower, Lindley – built 1902 (Grade II*)
Parsonage House – built 1904 (Grade II)
Edgar Wood Centre, Manchester – built 1906 (Grade I)
36 Mellalieu Street, Middleton – built 1906 (Grade II)
Hill House (formerly Davnyveed), Barley, Hertfordshire – built 1907 (Grade II*)
Upmeads, Stafford – built 1908 (Grade II*)
Elm Street School, Middleton – built 1910 (Grade II*)
Royd House, Hale – built 1916 (Grade I)
Edgecroft, Heywood – built 1921 (Grade II)

References
Citations

External links
Edgar Wood Society, Middleton
Edgar Wood biography from manchesterhistory.net
Complete list of Wood's works from manchesterhistory.net
Edgar Wood Heritage Group (Yorkshire)
Briarcourt restoration

People from Middleton, Greater Manchester
1860 births
1935 deaths
Architects from Greater Manchester